Martina Stoop (born 1 January 1973) is a Swiss hurdler. She competed in the women's 400 metres hurdles at the 1996 Summer Olympics.

References

1973 births
Living people
Athletes (track and field) at the 1996 Summer Olympics
Swiss female hurdlers
Olympic athletes of Switzerland
Place of birth missing (living people)